Common Base Event (CBE) is an IBM implementation of the Web Services Distributed Management (WSDM) Event Format standard. IBM also implemented the Common Event Infrastructure, a unified set of APIs and infrastructure for the creation, transmission, persistence and distribution of a wide range of business, system and network Common Base Event formatted events.

External links
Understanding Common Base Events Specification V1.0.1, IBM. 
Common Base Events Best Practices, IBM. 

Web services
IBM software